Suchdol is a municipality and village in Prostějov District in the Olomouc Region of the Czech Republic. It has about 600 inhabitants.

Administrative parts
Villages of Jednov and Labutice are administrative parts of Suchdol.

References

Villages in Prostějov District